Rodman José Valera Capon (born April 20, 1982 in Caracas) is a volleyball player from Venezuela. He won the gold medal with the men's national team at the 2003 Pan American Games in Santo Domingo, Dominican Republic. In the final Valera's team defeated Cuba 3-0 (25-23, 25–18, 25-20).

He won with his team the gold medal at the 2005 Bolivarian Games.

Awards

National Team

Senior Team
 2005 Bolivarian Games, -  Gold Medal

References

External links
 FIVB Profile

1982 births
Living people
Venezuelan men's volleyball players
Volleyball players at the 2008 Summer Olympics
Olympic volleyball players of Venezuela
Volleyball players at the 2003 Pan American Games
Volleyball players at the 2007 Pan American Games
Pan American Games gold medalists for Venezuela
Sportspeople from Caracas
Pan American Games medalists in volleyball
Medalists at the 2003 Pan American Games
20th-century Venezuelan people
21st-century Venezuelan people